Jaime Bleck  is an American sociologist. In 2014-2015, she was an American Council of Learned Societies (ACLS) Fellow.

She is Ford Family Assistant Professor of Political Science  at University of Notre Dame.

She spoke at Africa Symposium 2020, of The Wilson Center.

Works 
 Education and Empowered Citizenship in Mali, Johns Hopkins University Press, 2015.  
 Nicolas van de Walle, Continuity in Change: Electoral Politics in Africa 1990-2015, Cambridge University Press, 2018.

References

External links 

 Youth Perspectives on the Appropriate Role of Religion in Politics: EoA w/ Dr. Jaimie Bleck, MSU African Studies Center, Nov 16, 2021

Sociologists

Living people
Year of birth missing (living people)